Canticum Canticorum Salomonis is a choral composition by Polish composer Krzysztof Penderecki. It was finished in 1973.

Composition 

The composition was commissioned by the Gulbenkian Foundation and took Penderecki from 1970 to 1973 to finish it. It was premiered in Lisbon on June 5, 1973. Werner Andreas Albert conducted the Gulbenkian Orchestra and Les Percussions de Strasbourg, together with the NCRV Vocal Ensemble, which considered the composition too difficult to be performed. It is dedicated to Emil Breisach and was published by the Polish Music Publishing House and Schott Music.

Analysis 

The composition, which is in one movement, takes approximately 16 minutes to perform, and uses an erotic text which is extracted from the Song of Songs. It is scored for a 16-voice choir and orchestra.

Text 

Following is the complete text used in the composition:

Reception 
The composition received mixed opinions by critics. Opinions from Polish critics ranged from "one of the best of Penderecki's works", by Malinowski and Michałowski, and "colorful, subtle, elegant, and expressively discreet", by Zielinski, to remarks by Kaczynzki, who deplored the low dynamism of the composition and stated that the composition "deserved a warmer welcome, despite the incoherence of its texts". Polish critic Marian Fuks described the musical style of the work as "lukewarm".

References 

Compositions by Krzysztof Penderecki
1973 compositions
Choral compositions